Verkh-Biysk (Ĵap-Ayıl) is a rural locality (a selo) in Turochaksky District, the Altai Republic, Russia. The population was 465 as of 2016. There are 15 streets.

Geography 
Verkh-Biysk is located 27 km south of Turochak (the district's administrative centre) by road. Tuloy is the nearest rural locality.

References 

Rural localities in Turochaksky District